Grafschaft can refer to:
 a German term for county, in the sense that it is an area which belongs (or belonged) to a count. However, administrative districts that have never belonged to a count, which would also be called counties in English-speaking countries, are not called  in German.
 List of states in the Holy Roman Empire
 Grafschaft, Rhineland, a municipality in Rhineland-Palatinate, Germany
 Grafschaft (Schmallenberg), a part of Schmallenberg, in North Rhine-Westphalia, Germany
 Grafschaft Abbey, in Schmallenberg
 Grafschaft (Lenne), a river of North Rhine-Westphalia, Germany
 Grafschaft, Switzerland, a municipality of the canton of Valais